Timothy Sullivan ("Big Tim" Sullivan) (1862–1913) was a New York politician who controlled Manhattan's Bowery and Lower East Side districts.

Tim or Timothy Sullivan may also refer to:

Timothy Sullivan (composer) (born 1954), Canadian composer
Timothy Daniel Sullivan (1827–1914), Irish politician and poet
Timothy J. Sullivan (born 1944),  president of the College of William and Mary in Williamsburg, Virginia
Timothy S. Sullivan, rear admiral of the United States Coast Guard
Tim J. Sullivan, deputy sports editor of the New York Post
Timothy Sullivan (Irish judge) (1874–1949), Chief Justice of Ireland 1936–46
Timothy Sullivan (Medal of Honor) (1835–1910), American Civil War sailor
Tim Sullivan (athlete) (born 1975), Australian Paralympic track and field athlete
Tim Sullivan (writer) (born 1948), American science fiction author
Tim Sullivan (director) (born 1964), American film director and screenwriter
Tim Sullivan (British filmmaker) (born 1958), British film director and screenwriter
Ted Sullivan (baseball) (1851–1929), real name Timothy Sullivan
Tim Sullivan (sports columnist), American sports columnist